Markato (Greek: Μαρκάτο, meaning "market") is a neighbourhood in the central part of the city of Patras, Greece.  The origin of the name comes from the Italian word mercato which means market in which the Venetians arrived in 1699 and built a public market.  Later, the Ottoman Turks reconquered the area and remained until the Greek War of Independence.  The Turks destroyed the market, but the name is still in use today; the area today is known as the centre of the city's market.

Places
Ermou Street
Kapodistria Square

References
The first version of the article is translated and is based from the article at the Greek Wikipedia (el:Main Page)

Neighborhoods in Patras